Tala Rugby Club, or simply Tala, is an Argentine rugby union and field hockey club sited in Córdoba Province. The rugby team currently plays in the Torneo de Córdoba, the first division of the Unión Cordobesa de Rugby league system.

Tala is the most winning club of Córdoba, with 23 titles to date.

History
"Tala Rugby Club" was founded in Córdoba on November 11, 1944, by rugby enthusiasts from the General Paz, Juniors and Alta Córdoba districts. The institution was established in a train carriage located on the land of one of the founders. This carriage was used as the first headquarters and became a symbol of the club's bohemian spirit.

Tala chose black and white as the club's colours after being offered a set of playing kits which had been originally made for disbanded Club Pampero by a sporting goods store from the city. The team adopted the colors, which have remained to date.

Since its establishment in 1944, Tala has become one of the most successful clubs in Córdoba, winning the Torneo de Córdoba title 18 times and reaching the final of the Nacional de Clubes in 2006. The team also won 24 provincial titles.

Tala's main rival is La Tablada.

Titles
Torneo del Interior (1): 2004
Torneo del Centro (1): 2008
Torneo de Córdoba (23): 1971, 1972, 1975, 1979, 1980, 1981, 1982, 1983, 1984, 1985, 1986, 1989, 1990, 1995, 1998, 1999, 2004, 2007, 2011, 2014, 2015, 2016, 2017,2018

References

External links

 

Rugby union clubs in Córdoba Province
1944 establishments in Argentina
Rugby clubs established in 1944
Field hockey clubs in Córdoba Province